Ibrahim Zadran (born 12 December 2001) is an Afghan cricketer. He made his Test match debut for the Afghanistan cricket team in September 2019.

Domestic career
He made his List A debut for Mis Ainak Region in the 2017 Ghazi Amanullah Khan Regional One Day Tournament on 11 August 2017. He made his Twenty20 debut for Mis Ainak Knights in the 2017 Shpageeza Cricket League on 12 September 2017.

In September 2018, he was named in Nangarhar's squad in the first edition of the Afghanistan Premier League tournament.

In 2021, Ibrahim played for Boyne Hill in Berkshire. He played as an opener and scored 479 runs in 15 matches.

International career
In December 2017, he was named in Afghanistan's squad for the 2018 Under-19 Cricket World Cup. He was the leading run-scorer for Afghanistan in the tournament, with 186 runs.

In December 2018, he was named in Afghanistan's under-23 team for the 2018 ACC Emerging Teams Asia Cup.

In August 2019, he was named in Afghanistan's Test squad for their one-off match against Bangladesh. He made his Test debut for Afghanistan, in the one-off match against Bangladesh, on 5 September 2019. The following month, he was named in Afghanistan's squads for their series against the West Indies. He made his One Day International (ODI) debut for Afghanistan, against the West Indies, on 11 November 2019. He made his T20I debut for Afghanistan, also against the West Indies, on 14 November 2019.

In December 2019, he was named in Afghanistan's squad for the 2020 Under-19 Cricket World Cup. He was the leading run-scorer for Afghanistan in the tournament, with 240 runs in five matches. In June 2022, in the second match against Zimbabwe, Zadran scored his first century in ODI cricket, with an unbeaten 120 runs. In November 2022, he scored his second ODI century (106), against Sri Lanka in Pallekelle. He won the player of the match award. In the third match of the same series, he smashed 162 runs, breaking the record for highest score by a player from his country in this format.

References

External links
 

Living people
2001 births
Afghan cricketers
Afghanistan Test cricketers
Afghanistan One Day International cricketers
Afghanistan Twenty20 International cricketers
Mis Ainak Knights cricketers
Place of birth missing (living people)
Sportspeople from Khost
Nangarhar Leopards cricketers